Yong Peng High School  is a co-educational Chinese independent high school in Yong Peng, Johor, Malaysia.

References

External links
 

Batu Pahat District
Schools in Johor
Secondary schools in Malaysia
1957 establishments in Malaya
Chinese-language schools in Malaysia
Educational institutions established in 1957